These are the Billboard magazine Hot Dance Club Play number one hits of 1974.  October 26 was the premiere week of a dance-related chart in Billboard.  Its original charts were called Disco Action and featured songs that received the strongest response in New York City discothèques.

See also
1974 in music
List of number-one dance hits (United States)
List of artists who reached number one on the U.S. Dance chart

References

Some weeks may also be found at Billboard magazine courtesy of Google Books: 1970—1974.

1974
1974 record charts
1974 in American music